The Panamanian Chess Championship is the individual national chess championship of Panama. The first edition was played in 1945 and won by Rubén Darío Cabrera.  It was originally a biennial event, and from 1945 to 1961 six championships were played, and from 1962 to 1971 eight championships.  From 1972 to 1976, it was held annually, but the tournament of 1977 never finished because the beginning of a long schism in Panamanian chess. From 1978 to 1988, it was again held annually.

In 1982 and 1989, and from 1991 to 2004, two organizations held separate events, resulting in two champions, but in 1990 there was a single competition, and therefore one champion.  In 2004 both federations made peace, and since 2005 then there has only been one championship each year.  At the end of the 1970s, the first women's chess championship was started, and it became an annual event in 2002. Panama is the only country in the world where a father and daughter have been champions in the same year twice: 2004 and 2008. To show the rise of new isthmian chess, Panama took by the first time,  in 2008 the [[Absolut Sub-Zonal 2.3.2 (CentroAmerican)]] by the hand of Jorge Baúles, first IM of Panama. In the youth categories, the signal (abs) show a champion in one big tournament with various categories at same time.

In 2010 there was no play because of official budget trouble with "Pandeportes", the government sports entity (which had three chiefs in only eleven months), and the tournament was played in the firsts months of 2011. In the final round of the 2014 tournament, two players were tied in all playoffs and were proclaimed champions. One is a foreigner, but changed his country flag as Panamanian in ratings.fide.com in March 2015, and is the fourth to win the title.  Usually the Panamanian common considered overseas with over five years of residence, as one of their own.

Champions

References

 Federacion de Ajedrez de Panama
 Federacion de Ajedrez de Panama previous website
 Partial winners list from Ajedrez Ataque
 Detailed results: 2003-2005 editions
 AJEDREZ en Panamá www.bit.ly/ajedrezenpanama ..www.bit.ly/ajedrezpanama2..resultado www.bit.ly/ajedrezpanama coleccion # 7
 chessresults.com - This website is for sale! - Chess Resources and Information.
 "Finales y Problemas Elementales de Ajedrez" author "Luis Farrugia", recompiled by "Juan Ramon Martinez D'Ettore". copyright "Editora de la Nacion, Rep. de Panama, orden no. 1636, 1977.
 Sánchez se imponen en el torneo nacional de ajedrez

Specific
<Sánchez se imponen en el torneo nacional de ajedrez />

Chess national championships
Women's chess national championships
Championship
1945 in chess
Recurring sporting events established in 1945